Animal Planet is an American cable channel. It may also refer to:

TV channels
Regional
Animal Planet (European TV channel)
Animal Planet Nordic
Animal Planet (Southeast Asia)

Country-specific
Animal Planet (British TV channel)
Animal Planet (Canadian TV channel)
Animal Planet (Australia and New Zealand)
Animal Planet (Dutch TV channel)
Animal Planet Germany
Animal Planet Poland
Animal Planet (Indian TV channel)
Animal Planet (Italian TV channel)

Others
Animal Planet Heroes, an "umbrella rotation" of reality shows on Animal Planet
Animal Planet Live was a live stage show, at the two Universal theme parks, and was inspired by the TV channel Animal Planet
Animal Planet Report was a reality television series about reports on animals all over the United States
Animal Planet Zooventure, an American children's television game show

See also
Doraemon: Nobita and the Animal Planet, a feature-length Doraemon film